Angelroda is a village and a former municipality in the district Ilm-Kreis, in Thuringia, Germany founded in 958. Since December 2019, it is part of the municipality Martinroda.

References

Former municipalities in Thuringia
Ilm-Kreis
Schwarzburg-Rudolstadt